Genome Valley is an Indian high-technology business district spread across /(3.1 sq mi) in Hyderabad, India. It is located across the suburbs, Turakapally, Shamirpet, Medchal, Uppal, Patancheru, Jeedimetla, Gachibowli and Keesara. The Genome Valley has developed as a cluster for Biomedical research, training and manufacturing.

History
Genome Valley was commissioned in 1999 as S. P. Biotech Park in a public-private partnership with Bharat Biotech International, and its founder Krishna Ella, alongside private infrastructure companies such as Shapoorji Pallonji Group and ICICI Bank.

Alexandria Knowledge Park SEZ
In 2009, U.S.-based infrastructure giant Alexandria Real Estate Equities has announced its plans to invest in the bio-cluster, which led to the Alexandria Knowledge Park SEZ. The bio-cluster at Shamirpet holds Certification mark by the United States Patent and Trademark Office and the European Union.

IKP Knowledge Park
The IKP Knowledge Park is spread over 200 acres in Turakapally, is an initiative of ICICI Bank with five "innovation corridors" - a first of its kind knowledge-nurturing centre for Indian companies and a knowledge gateway for multinational companies".  The first phase of Innovation Corridor I, comprising 10 laboratories, around 3,000 ft² (300 m²) each, is operational and fully occupied. The second phase of Innovation Corridor I, comprising 16 laboratory modules of 1,700 ft² (170 m²) each, is ready for operation.

MN Park
In 2016, Mission Neutral Park has acquired specialized R&D assets in Genome Valley from U.S.-based Alexandria REIT and rechristened it as MN Park. It is a collaborative life sciences ecosystem in Genome Valley, Hyderabad consisting of Grade A R&D facilities.

MN Park is spread over 400 acres including build-up facilities of around 600,000 sq.ft. provided to global tenants like Novartis, GlaxoSmithKline, Mylan and Ashland Inc. MN’s focus area: Preleased industrial assets and specialized office spaces to sectors including specialized warehousing, logistics, food processing, light manufacturing, pharmaceutical R&D, biotechnology, etc.

Manufacturing

Dupont Knowledge Center
Shantha Biotechnics, a Sanofi company
Dr. Reddy's Laboratories
Bharat Biotech International
Aurobindo Pharma
United States Pharmacopeia
Lonza Group
Divis Laboratories
Glukem Biocare Private Limited
Ganules India Limited
Biocon
Bharat Biotech
Biological E. Limited
Johnson & Johnson India Limited
Novartis India Limited
Bayer Biosciences
Neuland Laboratories
BioServe Global
Indian Drugs and Pharmaceuticals Limited
Nuziveedu Seeds Private Limited
Advanta India
Monsanto
Merck KGaA
Makhteshim Agan
Roche Diagnostics
Mylan
Medtronic
Millipore
Albany Molecular Research
Biogenex International
Nektar Therapeutics
Avesthagen
Virchow Biotech
Phenomenex (chromatography company)
Metropolis
EPRCCRB - A Vitane group of companies

R & D

International Crops Research Institute for the Semi-Arid Tropics
Centre for Cellular and Molecular Biology
Indian Institute of Chemical Technology
Centre for DNA Fingerprinting and Diagnostics
Birla Institute of Technology and Science, Pilani – Hyderabad Campus
National Institute of Nutrition, Hyderabad
National Animal Resource Facility for Biomedical Research
National Institute of Animal Biotechnology
Indian Immunologicals Limited
National Institute of Pharmaceutical Education and Research, Hyderabad
Sir Ronald Ross Institute of Parasitology
Directorate of Rice and Oil Seeds Research
Central Forensic Science Laboratory, Hyderabad
Central Institute of Medicinal and Aromatic Plants
L. V. Prasad Eye Institute
National Academy of Agricultural Research Management
Centre for Computational Natural Sciences and Bioinformatics, IIIT Hyderabad
TCS Bioinformatics Innovation Lab, Hyderabad
Dr. Reddy's Institute of Life Sciences
Indo American Cancer Hospital and Research Institute
Central Research Institute for Dry Land Agriculture
Center For Sustainable Agriculture, Hyderabad
Central Food Technology Research Institute - Resource Center
Apollo Cell and Molecular Biology Research Center
American Oncology Institute
Asian Institute of Gastroenterology
Owaisi Center for Liver Research and diagnostics
 Alembic
 Bharat Biotech
 RCC Laboratories

Contract Research Organizations and Healthcare

Ocimum Biosolutions 
Excelra
Makro care
SIRO-Clinpharm
Sipra Labs
Alveus Pharmaceuticals
Sandor Proteomics
Laurus Labs
Bio-Axis
Clin Asia
Clintec International
Andronovo Labs
Piramal Clinical
 Diacel
 Vimta Labs
Aizant therapeutics
Incozen Therapeutics
Med-Himalayas
Sai advantum
Laxai Avanti
Mithros chemicals
Imptech Scientific

Others
DNA Labs India
Biomax Lifesciences
Center For Stem Cell Science, Hyderabad
Tran-Scell Biologics
RAS Life Sciences
Natco Pharma
Hetero Drugs
Reliysys
Celon Labs
Revelations Bio
Genetech India
Sudershan Bio
Aurigene
Vivimed Labs
Randstad India
Sami Labs Limited

See also

Financial District, Hyderabad
Hyderabad Pharma City
Fintech Valley Vizag
Department of Biotechnology
Pharmaceutical industry in India

References

1999 establishments in India
Economy of Hyderabad, India
Economy of Telangana
Industries in Hyderabad, India
Industrial parks in India
Science parks in India
Research institutes in Hyderabad, India
High-technology business districts in India
Biotechnology